Tamana al-Ghab (also spelled Tamaanat al-Ghab) is a village in northern Syria, administratively part of the Hama Governorate, located northwest of Hama. It is situated in the al-Ghab plain, east of the Orontes River. It is abutted by al-Ramlah to the north and Rasif to the south with other nearby localities including center Hurriya to the southeast, al-Huwash to the east, al-Amqiyah al-Tahta to the northeast, al-Ziyarah to the north, Nabl al-Khatib to the west and Shathah to the southwest. According to the Syria Central Bureau of Statistics (CBS), Tamana al-Ghab had a population of 2,696 in the 2004 census. Its inhabitants are predominantly Sunni Muslims.

According to residents of Tamana al-Ghab, the village has been mostly abandoned in the summer of 2012 after an attack that left 78 killed. According to the survivors the killing were carried out by the shabiha, a pro-government militia taking part in the ongoing Syrian Civil War.

References

Populated places in al-Suqaylabiyah District
Populated places in al-Ghab Plain